The 2005–06 Campionato Sammarinese di Calcio season is its twenty-first since its establishment. The top three clubs from each girone will compete in a playoff tournament. The winner will qualify for the first qualifying round of the UEFA Cup next season. This season marks the final season that the winner of the playoffs qualifies for the UEFA Cup. From next season on, the winner of the playoffs will qualify for the first qualifying round of the UEFA Champions League.

2005–06 teams

Girone A (8 teams)
 S.S. Cosmos (Serravalle)
 F.C. Domagnano (Domagnano)
 S.C. Faetano (Faetano)
 S.S. Folgore/Falciano (Serravalle)
 S.P. La Fiorita (Montegiardino)
 S.S. San Giovanni (Borgo Maggiore)
 S.P. Tre Fiori (Fiorentino)
 S.P. Tre Penne (Serravalle)

Girone B (7 teams)
 S.P. Cailungo (Borgo Maggiore)
 F.C. Fiorentino (Fiorentino)
 A.C. Juvenes/Dogana (Serravalle)
 A.C. Libertas (Borgo Maggiore)
 S.S. Murata (San Marino)
 S.S. Pennarossa (Chiesanuova)
 S.S. Virtus (Acquaviva)

Regular season

Group A

Group B

Results
All teams play twice against the teams within their own group and once against the teams from the other group.

Play-off

First round
The second place club will play the third place club from the opposite group.

|}

Second round
The first round winners play the first place clubs from each group.

|}

Third round
The losers from the first and second round play each other. The losers from this round are eliminated.

|}

Fourth round
The second round winners play each other. The winner advances to the finals and loser moves to the semifinals.

|}

The third round winners play each other and the loser is eliminated.

|}

Semifinal
The winner advances to the finals and the loser is eliminated.

|}

Final

References

Campionato Sammarinese di Calcio
San Marino
1